State Route 357 (SR 357) is a  east–west state highway in the northern portion of U.S. state of Ohio.

SR 357 is one of two Ohio state routes on Lake Erie islands (the other being SR 575). SR 357 once extended to the mainland of Ohio via the Catawba Island ferry. It officially carries a north–south routing, but a single reassurance marker along the route displays "west" instead of "south."

Route description

The entirety of SR 357 exists within the confines of South Bass Island in Lake Erie. It is located within Put-in-Bay Township in Ottawa County. In 2012, between 490 and 590 vehicles travel on the road on average each day. SR 357 begins at West Shore Boulevard, and travels southwestward. The route passes by Oak Point State Park, and becomes part of Bayview Avenue. SR 357 then intersects County Route 163, which leads to the Put-in-Bay Airport, and the Put-in-Bay–Catawba Island ferry. The route later leaves Put-in-Bay, near Perry's Victory and International Peace Memorial. SR 357 turns northeast to Columbus Avenue, and later ends at a dead end near the lake, next to a driveway.

History
The SR 357 designation was created in 1934.  At the time, the highway was routed along the entirety of its present alignment on South Bass Island. However, in 1946, when SR 53 was extended northerly from Port Clinton to end at its present northern terminus in Catawba Island, SR 357 was simultaneously extended south onto the mainland via the ferry that connects Put-in-Bay with Catawba Island, then south along SR 53 to a new southern terminus at SR 2 east of Port Clinton. By 1969, all of the 1946 extension of SR 357 was eliminated, with the Put-in-Bay–Catawba Island ferry becoming a connector between the southern end of SR 357 and the northern endpoint of SR 53, and the mainland portion of SR 357 becoming just SR 53. By 1973, the Put-in-Bay–Catawba Island ferry docked on the south side of South Bass Island, ending the direct access to ferry docks and the rest of the state highway system from SR 357.

Major intersections

References

External links

State Route 357 Pavement Markings 

357
Transportation in Ottawa County, Ohio